Marginella gloriosa is a species of sea snail, a marine gastropod mollusk in the family Marginellidae, the margin snails.

Description

Distribution
This marine species occurs off Western Africa.

References

 Cossignani T. (2006). Marginellidae & Cystiscidae of the World. L'Informatore Piceno. 408pp

External links
 Jousseaume, F. (1884). Description de mollusques nouveaux. Bulletin de la Société Zoologique de France. 9: 169-192, pl. 4
 Dautzenberg P. (1910). Contribution à la faune malacologique de l'Afrique occidentale. Actes de la Société Linnéenne de Bordeaux. 64: 47-228, pls 1-4

gloriosa
Gastropods described in 1884